The M200 is a turbocharged inline-four engine produced since 2013 by Mercedes-Benz.

Design 
The engine is based on the Renault H5Ft engine, marketed as Energy TCe 115, due to Daimler AG's collaboration with the Renault–Nissan–Mitsubishi Alliance. It features 4 valves per cylinder, variable valve timing, a start-stop system, a three-way catalytic converter, and iron-carbon alloy coating on the cylinder walls to reduce friction. It is also compliant with the Euro 5 emission standards.

Models

M200 DE12 LA 
 2013–present W415 Citan 112 BlueEFFICIENCY

References 

Mercedes-Benz engines
Straight-four engines
Gasoline engines by model